De'Angelo Henderson Sr. (born November 24, 1992) is a former American football running back. He played college football at Coastal Carolina University where he set an NCAA Division 1 record for touchdowns in consecutive games at 35.

Early years
Henderson attended and played high school football at Summerville High School for the Green Wave.

College career
Henderson attended and played college football at Coastal Carolina. In the 2013 season, he finished with 82 carries for 599 rushing yards and six rushing touchdowns. In the 2014 season, he finished with 234 carries for 1,534 rushing yards and 20 rushing touchdowns. In the 2015 season, he finished with 222 carries for 1,346 rushing yards and 16 rushing touchdowns. In his final collegiate season in 2016, he had 183 carries for 1,156 rushing yards and 16 rushing touchdowns.

Professional career

Denver Broncos
Henderson was drafted by the Denver Broncos in the sixth round, 203rd overall, in the 2017 NFL Draft. He became the sixth Coastal Carolina Chanticleer to be drafted and the first since Lorenzo Taliaferro and Matt Hazel in 2014. On September 24, against the Buffalo Bills in Week 3, Henderson recorded the first carry of his NFL career, a one-yard rush. In the regular season finale against the Kansas City Chiefs, he scored his first career professional touchdown, a 29-yard reception from quarterback Paxton Lynch. In five games in the 2017 season, he finished with seven carries for 13 rushing yards to go along with two receptions for 36 receiving yards and a receiving touchdown.

On September 1, 2018, Henderson was waived by the Broncos.

New York Jets
On September 3, 2018, Henderson was signed to the New York Jets' practice squad. He was promoted to the active roster on October 27, 2018. He was waived on November 2, 2018 and was re-signed to the practice squad. He was promoted back to the active roster on December 14, 2018.
In three games in the 2018 season, he had two carries for 19 yards. Henderson was released by the Jets on July 23, 2019.

Minnesota Vikings
On July 24, 2019, Henderson was claimed off waivers by the Minnesota Vikings. He was waived on August 31, 2019.

Philadelphia Eagles
Henderson was signed to the Philadelphia Eagles' practice squad on October 14, 2019. His practice squad contract with the team expired on January 13, 2020.

Houston Roughnecks
Henderson signed with the Houston Roughnecks of the XFL on January 8, 2020. He had his contract terminated when the league suspended operations on April 10, 2020.

References

External links
New York Jets bio
Coastal Carolina Chanticleers bio

1992 births
Living people
American football running backs
Coastal Carolina Chanticleers football players
Denver Broncos players
Houston Roughnecks players
Minnesota Vikings players
New York Jets players
People from Summerville, South Carolina
Philadelphia Eagles players
Players of American football from South Carolina
Sportspeople from Charleston, South Carolina